Yatta, also known as Yattah or Yutta, is a Palestinian city located in the Hebron Governorate of the State of Palestine, in the West Bank, approximately 8 km south of the city of Hebron. According to the Palestinian Central Bureau of Statistics, it had a population of 64,277 in 2016.

History

Antiquity 
Located on a large, ancient hilltop, Yatta has been identified with the site of the Biblical town of Juttah. In 1931, a Jewish burial complex dating to the 2nd century CE was found in the town. In the 4th century CE, Eusebius wrote that Yatta was "a very large village of Jews eighteen miles south of Beit Gubrin." 

Some Palestinian residents of the town believe they originate from the Jewish kingdom of Khaybar in the south-western Arabian peninsula and are descended from the Jewish tribes of Arabia. Research by Yitzhak Ben Zvi in 1928 also suggested that three out of the six hamulas (or extended families) in Yatta belonged to the Makhamra extended family which possibly descended from a Jewish Arab tribe. In 1938, Arab families from Yatta were reported to observe the Jewish holiday of Hanukkah, lighting candles purchased from the Jewish community in Hebron.

Ottoman era
Yatta, like the rest of Palestine, was incorporated into the Ottoman Empire in 1517, and in the census of 1596 the village appeared to be in the Nahiya of Khalil of the Liwa of Quds. It had a population of 127 families, all Muslim, and paid taxes on wheat, barley, olives, goats and bee-hives; a total of 9,872 akçe. 5/6 of the revenue went to a Waqf.

In 1838, Edward Robinson and noted Yutta as a Muslim village, located southwest of el-Khulil. He further noted that it had the "appearance of a large modern Mohammedan town, on low eminence, with trees around."

In July 1863 Victor Guérin visited Youttha. He described it as a village of 2,000 inhabitants, but at least half were living in tents, scattered in the all over, partly to finish the harvest, partly to avoid the military recruiters active in the area. An Ottoman village list from about 1870 found that Jatta had a population of 226, in 66 houses, though the population count only included men.

In 1883, the PEF's Survey of Western Palestine described Yatta as being a "large village standing high on a ridge. It is largely built of stone. The water supply is from cisterns. On the south there are rock-cut tombs, and rock wine-presses are found all round the village. The neighborhood is extremely stony; south of the village are scattered olives, which are conspicuous objects; on the west, a little lower under a cliff, is a small olive yard in which the camp of the Survey party was pitched in 1874; to the south-west of camp were a few figs. The inhabitants are very rich in flocks; the village owned, it was said, 17,000 sheep, beside goats, cows, camels, horses, and donkeys. The Sheikh alone had 250 sheep." South of the village are several tombs; one has a shallow semicircular arch cut above a small square entrance. West of the village and of el Muturrif is a very fine rock-cut wine-press. A second occurs north of the village."

British Mandate era
In the 1922 census of Palestine conducted by the British Mandate authorities, Yatta had a population 3,179 inhabitants, all Muslims, increasing in the 1931 census to 4,034, in 767 inhabited houses, still all Muslims.

In the 1945 statistics the population of Yatta was 5,260, all Muslims, and the land area was 174,172 dunams according to an official land and population survey. 3,254 dunams were plantations and irrigable land, 67,498 used for cereals, while 216 dunams were built-up (urban) land.

Jordanian era
In the wake of the 1948 Arab-Israeli War, and after the 1949 Armistice Agreements, Yatta came under Jordanian rule.

The Jordanian census of 1961 found 6,326 inhabitants in Yatta.

Post-1967

Since the 1967 Arab–Israeli War, Yatta, like the rest of the West Bank has been occupied by Israel; since 1995, it has been governed by the PNA as part of Area A of the West Bank.

The population in the 1967 census conducted by the Israeli authorities several months after the Six-Day War was 7,281.

On 17 September 2001, a Jewish terrorist group, the Bat Ayin Underground, planted two bombs in the schoolyard at Yatta: One was timed to explode during the recess, and a second bomb several minutes later, in the expectation that teachers and students would be drawn to examine the damage. A malfunction caused the first bomb to explode earlier, and Israeli sappers managed to defuse the second bomb in time.

At least seven Palestinians were killed in Yatta during the Second Intifada in different incidents from 2002 to 2004. On March 8, 2012 Israeli soldiers shot dead 20-year-old Zakariya Abu Eram and injured two others during a raid in the town with the intent of arresting Abu Eram's uncle, Khaled Mahamra. Khaled Mahamra is a Hamas member responsible for the June 2016 Tel Aviv shooting, who was sentenced to life in prison and released as part of the exchange deal to free captive IDF soldier Gilad Schalit. The Israelis stated they fired at the men only after one of them stabbed a soldier during the arrest attempt.

In June 2016, two assailants from Yatta were apprehended after firing upon Israelis dining in a Tel-Aviv café, after which they were charged with killing four people and injuring 16 others.

In June 2019, the mayor of Yatta announced that he decided to change the name of Bahrain Street in his municipality to Marzouq al-Ghanim Street as an act of protest against Bahrain's hosting of a US-led economic workshop.

Culture
A Jillayeh dress from Yatta from around 1910 is part of the Museum of International Folk Art (MOIFA) at Museum of New Mexico at Santa Fe.

See also
Masafer Yatta, collection of 19 hamlets within Yatta's municipal boundary
Shabab Yatta, local football club

References

Bibliography

 
 

 
 
 
 
 
 
 
 (p. 193)

External links
 yatta-munc.org 
Welcome To The City of Yatta
Yatta, Welcome to Palestine
Survey of Western Palestine, Map 21: IAA, Wikimedia commons 
 Yatta Town (Fact Sheet), Applied Research Institute–Jerusalem (ARIJ)
 Yatta Town Profile, ARIJ
 Yatta Town aerial photo, ARIJ
 The priorities and needs for development in Yatta city based on the community and local authorities' assessment, ARIJ

Cities in the West Bank
Ancient Jewish settlements of Judaea
13 Kohanic cities
Municipalities of the State of Palestine